List of speakers of the Parliament of Åland.

Below is a list of office-holders:

Sources
 Official website of the Parliament of Åland (in Swedish)

Politics of Åland
Aland